Jean Frédéric Auguste Delsarte (19 October 1903, Fourmies – 28 November 1968, Nancy) was a French mathematician known for his work in mathematical analysis, in particular, for introducing mean-periodic functions and generalised shift operators. He was one of the founders of the Bourbaki group. He was an invited speaker at the International Congress of Mathematicians in 1932 at Zürich.

Selected publications
 
 Application de la théorie des fonctions moyenne-périodiques à la résolution de certaines équations intégrales (1934)
 Application de la théorie des fonctions moyenne-périodiques à la résolution des équations de Fredholm-Nörlund (1935)
 
 Fonctions moyenne-périodiques sur un groupe abstrait (1937)

External links

1903 births
1968 deaths
People from Fourmies, Nord
20th-century French mathematicians
Nicolas Bourbaki
École Normale Supérieure alumni
Mathematical analysts
Chevaliers of the Légion d'honneur
Commandeurs of the Ordre des Palmes Académiques